The men's Greco-Roman heavyweight was one of thirteen wrestling events held as part of the wrestling at the 1928 Summer Olympics programme. The competition was held from August 2 to 5, and featured 15 wrestlers from 15 nations.

Competition format

This Greco-Roman wrestling competition introduced an elimination system based on the accumulation of points. Each round featured all wrestlers pairing off and wrestling one bout (with one wrestler having a bye if there were an odd number). The loser received 3 points. The winner received 1 point if the win was by decision and 0 points if the win was by fall. At the end of each round, any wrestler with at least 5 points was eliminated.

Results

Round 1

The first round produced 4 winners by fall (0 points), 1 bye (0 points), 3 winners by decision (1 point), and 7 losers (3 points).

 Bouts

 Points

Round 2

All 7 bouts were won by fall, with none of the winners gaining any points. Donati, Gehring, and Urban stayed at 0; Çoban, Svensson (with a bye), and Weisberger stayed at 1; Nyström and Zvejnieks stayed at 3. Also with 3 points were Badó and Simonis, after their first loss each. The other 5 round 2 losers had also lost in round 1; they were eliminated.

 Bouts

 Points

Round 3

The Urban–Donati and Gehring–Çoban bouts each featured 2 wrestlers with fewer than 2 points and therefore no elimination possible for either wrestler in the bout. The Nyström–Wiesberger bout also ended in no eliminations, as Nyström won by decision to leave both wrestlers at 4 points. Zvejnieks and Simonis were eliminated. Urban was the only man left with 0 points; Gehring and Svensson also remained below 2 points and thus safe from elimination in the next round.

 Bouts

 Points

Round 4

All 4 bouts this round were won by fall; Nyström and Wiesberger needed to win that way to continue, as they started (and ended) with 4 points. Svensson and Gehring each stayed at 1 point, now in the lead as Urban took his first loss and moved to 3 points. The other three losers, Badó, Çoban, and Donati, were eliminated.

 Bouts

 Points

Round 5

The two leaders faced off (neither could be eliminated, however), with Svensson prevailing (ultimately securing himself the gold medal). Urban, who had 0 points after 3 rounds, now had 6 points after two consecutive losses and was eliminated in 5th place. Wiesberger was also eliminated in his victory over Urban, as he needed a win by fall to continue but won by decision instead. Nyström had a bye.

 Bouts

 Points

Round 6

The only bout possible was Nyström against Gehring, as Svensson had already faced each of the other wrestlers. Svensson thus ended up with his second bye of the tournament and the gold medal.

 Bouts

 Points

References

1928 Summer Olympics events